Tang Zard may refer to:
 Tang Zard, Ilam
 Tang Zard, Kohgiluyeh and Boyer-Ahmad